Lake Isabel (also rendered Lake Isabelle and Lake Isabell) is a lake in Dakota County, in the U.S. state of Minnesota.

Lake Isabel was named for a daughter of the founder of Hastings.

See also
List of lakes in Minnesota

References

Lakes of Minnesota
Lakes of Dakota County, Minnesota